Trinchesia is a genus of sea slugs, aeolid nudibranchs, marine gastropod molluscs in the family Trinchesiidae. All species were transferred to Tenellia as a result of a DNA phylogeny study in 2016. The genus was dismembered and broken into several smaller genera in 2017 with further DNA evidence and a re-interpretation of genus and family characteristics.

Trinchesia species feed on hydroids.

Species 
Species in the genus Trinchesia included:
 Trinchesia acinosa (Risbec, 1928)
 Trinchesia akibai (Baba, 1984)
 Trinchesia albocrusta (MacFarland, 1966)
 Trinchesia albopunctata Schmekel, 1968
 Trinchesia alpha (Baba & Hamatani, 1963)
 Trinchesia anulata (Baba, 1949)
 Trinchesia beta (Baba & Abe, 1964)
 Trinchesia caerulea (Montagu, 1804) - type species of Trinchesia
 Trinchesia catachroma (Burn, 1963)
 Trinchesia colmani (Burn, 1961)
 Trinchesia divanica Martynov, 2002
 Trinchesia foliata (Forbes & Goodsir, 1839)
 Trinchesia genovae (O'Donoghue, 1929)
 Trinchesia granosa Schmekel, 1966
 Trinchesia hiranorum Martynov, Sanamyan & Korshunova, 2015
 Trinchesia ilonae Schmekel, 1968
 Trinchesia kanga Edmunds, 1970
 Trinchesia kuiteri (Rudman, 1981)
 Trinchesia lenkae Martynov, 2002
 Trinchesia macquariensis Burn, 1973
 Trinchesia midori Martynov, Sanamyan & Korshunova, 2015
 Trinchesia miniostriata Schmekel, 1968
 Trinchesia ocellata Schmekel, 1966
 Trinchesia ornata (Baba, 1937)
 Trinchesia pupillae (Baba, 1961)
 Trinchesia reflexa (Miller, 1977)
 Trinchesia scintillans (M. C. Miller, 1977)
 Trinchesia sibogae (Bergh, 1905)
 Trinchesia sororum Burn, 1964
 Trinchesia speciosa (Macnae, 1954)
 Trinchesia taita Edmunds, 1970
 Trinchesia thelmae (Burn, 1964)
 Trinchesia virens (MacFarland, 1966)
 Trinchesia viridiana (Burn, 1962)
 Trinchesia yamasui (Hamatani, 1993)
 Trinchesia zelandica (Odhner, 1924)

Species names currently considered to be synonyms:
 Trinchesia pustulata (Alder & Hancock, 1854) synonym of Zelentia pustulata (Alder & Hancock, 1854)
 Trinchesia viridis (Forbes, 1840) synonym of Diaphoreolis viridis (Forbes, 1840)

References

External links

Trinchesiidae
Taxa named by Hermann von Ihering